Khurram Dastgir Khan (Punjabi, ; born 3 August 1970) is a Pakistani politician who has been a member of the National Assembly of Pakistan since August 2018. Previously, he was a member of the National Assembly  of Pakistan from 2008 to 2013 and again from 2013 to 2018. He is current Federal Minister for Power of Pakistan

He served as Minister for Defence and Minister for Foreign Affairs, in Abbasi cabinet from August 2017 and May 2018, respectively, until May 2018. He served as Minister of State for Science and Technology, Minister of State for Privatisation and Minister of State for Commerce between 2013 and 2014. He served as the Minister for Commerce from 2014 to 2017.

Khan studied engineering from the California Institute of Technology and economics at Bowdoin College.

Early life and education
Khan was born on 3 August 1970.

Khan studied at the St. Joseph's High School in Gujranwala and Cadet College, Hasan Abdal.

Khan attended the Bowdoin College in Brunswick, Maine from where he holds a degree in Economics and was trained as an electrical engineer at the California Institute of Technology.

Career

In 1999, he was serving as Special Assistant to then Prime Minister of Pakistan Nawaz Sharif until his tenure was terminated during 1999 Pakistani coup d'état staged by Pervez Musharraf.

He ran for the seat of National Assembly of Pakistan from Gujranwala constituency as a candidate of PML (N) in 2002 Pakistani general elections but was unsuccessful. Reportedly, he was booked for terrorist activities; for beating up two PPP activists at a polling station and for getting a provocative pamphlet published about a rival candidate in separate cases.

From 2006 to 2009, he worked on building his reputation in the PML-N where he eventually became party's central deputy secretary information.

He was elected to the National Assembly for the first time as a candidate of PML(N) in 2008 Pakistani general election. In October 2008, he was elected as Chairman of the Standing Committee of National Assembly on Commerce.

He was re-elected to the National Assembly for the second time as a candidate of PML (N) in 2013 Pakistani general election. Upon PML-N victory in the 2013 general election, Khan was first appointed as Minister of State for Science and Technology. Later, he was made Minister of State for Privatisation as well Chairman of the Privatisation Commission of Pakistan. In December 2013, he was appointed as the Minister of State for Commerce.

In January 2014, he was elevated to the rank of federal minister and was appointed as the Minister for Commerce for the first time. He had ceased to hold ministerial office in July 2017 when the federal cabinet was disbanded following the disqualification of Prime Minister Nawaz Sharif after Panama Papers case decision.

Following the election of Shahid Khaqan Abbasi as Prime Minister of Pakistan, Khan was inducted into the federal cabinet of Abbasi and was appointed Minister for Defence for the first time. In May 2018, he was given the additional portfolio of Minister for Foreign Affairs. Upon the dissolution of the National Assembly on the expiration of its term on 31 May 2018, Khan ceased to hold the office as Federal Minister for Foreign Affairs and Federal Minister for Defence.

He was re-elected to the National Assembly as a candidate of PML-N from Constituency NA-81 (Gujranwala-III) in 2018 Pakistani general election.

References

|-

|-

|-

|-

|-

1970 births
Living people
Punjabi people
Pakistani MNAs 2008–2013
Pakistani MNAs 2013–2018
Pakistani expatriates in the United States
Pakistani electrical engineers
Nawaz Sharif administration
Pakistan Muslim League (N) politicians
Commerce Ministers of Pakistan
Cadet College Hasan Abdal alumni
Defence Ministers of Pakistan
People from Gujranwala
California Institute of Technology alumni
Bowdoin College alumni
Dastgir family
Pakistani MNAs 2018–2023
Pakistani people of Kashmiri descent